Cher is the eighteenth studio album by American singer-actress Cher, released on November 10, 1987 by Geffen Records. The album has been certified Platinum in the US by the RIAA and Gold in Australia by ARIA and the UK by BPI.

Background
Five years after the release of Cher's last album, I Paralyze, and her decision to focus on a film career, Cher signed with Geffen Records (which would later absorb one of her former labels, MCA Records) and was rushed to the studio to record what would become her comeback album. The self-titled album, Cher, was released in the fall of 1987 and was produced by Michael Bolton, Jon Bon Jovi, Richie Sambora and Desmond Child. Among the notable guest artists, Bonnie Tyler and Darlene Love were backing vocalists on "Perfection".

After a series of pop and disco records, Cher moved to a radio-friendly rock sound, which helped her get back onto the charts. The album includes a new version of her 1966 hit "Bang Bang (My Baby Shot Me Down)", Michael Bolton's "I Found Someone"—which Bolton and Mark Mangold had originally written for Laura Branigan, released on her 1985 album Hold Me—several songs written by Desmond Child, and two by Diane Warren, who would go on to write many more songs for the singer.

This was also her third album to be named Cher or Chér, as Gypsys, Tramps and Thieves was initially released under the name Chér before it was retitled following the success of the single of the same name, while a studio album in 1966 was also entitled Chér.

Reception
The album reached No. 26 in the UK and peaked at No. 32 on the US Billboard album charts. The first single released from the album and its only UK top 10 hit was "I Found Someone", which reached No. 5 in the UK and No. 10 in the US. The second single, "We All Sleep Alone", peaked at No. 14 on Billboards Hot 100 chart and just missed breaking the Adult Contemporary top 10 in the US, stalling at No. 11. It was less successful in the UK, however, peaking at No. 47. The album's third single was "Skin Deep". The fourth and final single  was "Main Man", released in the US and Australia in October 1988.

"Bang Bang", was released as a promotional single in Europe.

Promotion
On November 13, 1987, Cher appeared on Late Night with David Letterman, where she performed "I Found Someone" and "I Got You Babe", the latter with ex-husband Sonny Bono. Later released on VHS, the Late Night performance would be her last with Bono before his death. On November 21, Cher appeared as the musical guest on Saturday Night Live, performing "I Found Someone" and "We All Sleep Alone". The album was also promoted on UK television.

Track listing

Personnel
Adapted from AllMusic.

 Peter Asher – producer (7), percussion (7)
 Phillip Ashley – keyboards (1, 10)
 Michael Bolton –  producer (1, 10), background vocals (3)
 Jon Bon Jovi –  producer (2, 3), background vocals (2, 3)
 Jeff Bova – keyboards (1, 10)
 Jimmy Bralower – drums (6, 9)
 David Bryan – keyboards (2, 3), synthesizer (2)
 Rosemary Butler – background vocals (7)
 Thom Cadley – assistant engineer
 Elaine Caswell – background vocals (4-6, 9)
 Cher – primary artist, vocals
 Desmond Child – producer (2-6, 9), background vocals (2-4, 9)
 Michael Christopher – engineer (1, 10)
 George Cowan – assistant engineer
 Bridget Daly – assistant engineer
 Patty d'Arcy – background vocals (1, 10)
 Jim Dineen – assistant engineer
 Debra Dobkin – background vocals (8)
 Michael Fisher – percussion (7)
 Chris Floberg – assistant engineer
 Greg Fulginiti – original mastering
 Albhy Galuten – drums, additional production (10)
 Seth Glassman – bass guitar (4)
 Mark Goldenberg – guitar
 Diana Grasselli – background vocals (3, 6)
 Jimmy Haslip – bass guitar (8)
 Jay Healy – assistant engineer
 Chris Isca – assistant engineer
 Rob Jacobs – additional engineering (2, 3)
 Doug Katsaros – keyboards (1)
 Chuck Kentis – keyboards, synthesizer (4-6, 9), additional keyboards (2, 3)
 Daren Klein – engineer (8)
 Larry Klein – bass guitar (7)
 Holly Knight – background vocals (2), additional keyboards (3)
 Craig Krampf – drums and drum programming (8)
 Matthew "Boomer" La Monica – assistant engineer
 Chris Laidlaw – assistant engineer
 Michael Landau – guitar (7)
 Will Lee – bass guitar (1, 10)
 Tony Levin – bass guitar (9)
 Jolie Jones Levine – assistant producer (8)
 Jon Lind – producer (8)
 Ken Lomas – assistant engineer
 Darlene Love – featured vocals (6)
 Steve Lukather – guitar (1)
 Bob Mackie – clothing/wardrobe, wardrobe
 Gregg Mangiafico – keyboards and synthesizer (5, 6, 9)
 Bob Mann – guitar solo (7)
 Jerry Marotta – drums (4-6, 9)
 Arnold McCuller – background vocals (7)
 John McCurry – guitar (1, 4-6, 10)
 Dave Meniketti – background vocals (3)
 Louis Merlino – background vocals (2, 4-6, 9)
 Mark Morgan – synthesizer, Hammond organ (8)
 Nancy Nash – background vocals (2)
 Gene Parciasepe - additional engineering (6, 9)
 Chris Parker – drums (1)
 Mark Partis – additional engineering (10)
 Bill Payne – keyboards (7)
 Sir Arthur Payson – engineer (2-6, 9)
 Frank Pekoc – assistant engineer
 Csaba Petocz – engineer (8)
 John Putnam – guitar (4, 9)
 Gabrielle Raumberger – art direction, design, hand tinting
 Sharon Rice – assistant engineer
 Vicki Sue Robinson – background vocals (10)
 Bob Rock – mixing (2, 3)
 Matthew Rolston – photography
 Richie Sambora – producer (2, 3), guitar (2, 3), background vocals (2)
 Brian Scheuble – assistant engineer
 Michael Schmidt – clothing and wardrobe, wardrobe
 Bernie Shanahan – background vocals (2, 3, 9)
 Ira Siegel – guitar (10)
 John Siegler – bass guitar (5)
 Gary Solomon – assistant engineer
 Ken Steiger – assistant engineer
 Alec John Such – bass guitar (2, 3)
 Bette Sussman – piano (4)
 David Thoener – mixing (1, 4-6, 8-10)
 Michael Thompson – guitar (8)
 Tico Torres – drums (2, 3)
 Ted Trewhella – assistant engineer
 Joe Lynn Turner – background vocals (2-4, 6, 9)
 Red Turner – clothing and wardrobe
 Bonnie Tyler – featured vocals (6)
 Myriam Naomi Valle – background vocals (3-6, 9)
 John Van Tongeren – synthesizer (8), bass guitar (8)
 Jim Vanzino – assistant engineer
 Carlos Vega – drums (7)
 Bob Vogt – assistant engineer
 Waddy Wachtel – guitar (7)
 Diane Warren – background vocals (6)
 Julia Waters – background vocals (8)
 Maxine Willard Waters – background vocals (8)
 Maurice White – vamp vocals (8)
 Melanie Williams – coordination
 Frank Wolf – engineer and mixing (7)
 Gary Wright – assistant engineer
 Shelly Yakus – additional engineering (3)

Charts

Weekly charts

Year-end charts

Certifications and sales

References

External links

1987 albums
Cher albums
Albums produced by Desmond Child
Albums produced by Peter Asher
Albums produced by Richie Sambora
Geffen Records albums
Albums recorded at Electric Lady Studios